Inape chara is a species of moth of the family Tortricidae. It is found in Ecuador (Pichincha Province).

The ground colour of the forewings is cream, tinged with brownish in the basal half of the wing and with pale ferruginous in the posterior part. The hindwings are white cream with whitish strigulation.

Etymology
The species name refers to the facies of the species and is derived from Greek chara (meaning nice).

References

Moths described in 2008
Endemic fauna of Ecuador
Moths of South America
chara
Taxa named by Józef Razowski